Nellie Stockbridge (1868 – May 22, 1965) was an early Idaho frontier mining district photographer.

Biography
Stockbridge moved from Chicago, Illinois to Wallace, Idaho. She arrived in 1899 to provide photo touch-up work for the at T.N. Barnard's studio, eventually running the studio.

Stockbridge's subject included everyday subjects in Wallace like townscapes and events, but she also photographed the local mines including portraits of miners and capturing mining disasters.

Her career spanned over 60 years. She was the oldest living member of the Zonta International club for advancement of women when she died in 1965.

Works

Photographic books

External links
Barnard Stockbridge Collection (about the collection held at the University of Idaho)
Historical Photographs in the University of Idaho Library
Silver Lining: The Early Days of Idaho's Silver Valley video

References

1868 births
1965 deaths
American women photographers
Photographers from Idaho